Sør-Trøndelag was a county comprising the southern portion of the present-day Trøndelag county in Norway.  It bordered the old Nord-Trøndelag county as well as the counties of Møre og Romsdal, Oppland, and Hedmark. To the west is the Norwegian Sea (Atlantic Ocean), and to the east is Jämtland in Sweden. The county was separated into a northern and southern part by the Trondheimsfjord. Slightly over 200,000 of the county's population (or around 55%) lives in the city of Trondheim and its suburbs. The Norwegian dialect of the region is Trøndersk.

The region was divided into two administrative counties in 1804. In 2016, the two county councils voted to merge into a single county on 1 January 2018.

Name 

The name Sør-Trøndelag was created in 1919. It means '(the) southern (part of) Trøndelag'.

Until 1919 the name of the county was Søndre Trondhjems amt. The meaning of this name was '(the) southern (part of) Trondhjems amt'. (The old Trondhjems amt, created in 1662, was divided in 1804. Trondhjem is the old form of Trondheim.)

See also Nord-Trøndelag

Coat of arms 

Geography 
Trondheim is the largest city and the county's administrative center.

The broad and long Trondheimsfjord is at the center of this county, although the coastal areas stretch somewhat further north. The mountain ranges Dovrefjell and Trollheimen are located in the south, while the Fosen peninsula is located north of the fjord. Its longest river is Orkla which runs through Trøndelag and the old county of Hedmark which is now part of Innlandet county.

Several of the best salmon rivers in Europe are located in the county, the largest and most famous being Gaula and Orkla. Dovrefjell–Sunndalsfjella National Park, Forollhogna National Park,  Skarvan and Roltdalen National Park and Femundsmarka National Park are located, or partly located, in the county.

History 
People have lived in this region for thousands of years (see Rock carvings in Central Norway, Nøstvet and Lihult cultures and Corded Ware culture). The fertile lowland bordering the Trondheimsfjord was probably the most important power centre in the Viking Age. Oretinget was an assembly hall located alongside the Nid River in Trondheim that served as the coronation place for Viking kings such as Harald Fairhair (865 to 933 AD) and his son Haakon I the Good. Nidaros (the former name of Trondheim) served as Norway's capital during the Viking era up until the early part of the 13th century.

Trondheim was the seat of the archbishop for several centuries, and an important pilgrimage destination following the death of St Olav in 1030.

Røros, in the southeastern part of the county, is a well-preserved mining town on a mountain plateau, and is a Unesco World Heritage Site.

Economy 
Mining in Røros and Løkken in Meldal lasted for about 300 years, and Thamshavnbanen, the old electric railway from Orkdal to Løkken, is still usable. The constant fires used to crack the rock in the mines demanded vast amounts of firewood; the montane forests on the mountain plateau near Røros still have not fully recovered. Along the coast, fishing has always been important. Farming was and still is important in the whole county, with the most economical important agriculture taking place in the fertile lowland valleys, such as in Melhus, Orkdal, Skaun, Midtre Gauldal, Malvik and Trondheim, but also near the outer seaboard, such as in Ørland and Rissa. The city of Trondheim has always been at the centre of this area, with administrative functions, as well as industry based on agricultural produce, and more recently education, high-tech business and healthcare.

Transportation

Sør-Trøndelag is connected to the other counties by the European Route 6 (E6) which passes by Trondheim and connects Oslo in the south and runs north along the coast and terminates just east of Kirkenes in Finnmark. European route E39 connects Sør-Trøndelag to Møre og Romsdal.

There are two airports in Sør-Trøndelag: Røros airport and Ørland airport. Trondheim's airport, Værnes, is actually located in Stjørdal in Nord-Trøndelag.

There are local trains that connect several municipalities; there are also trains that connect Trondheim to Oslo, Bodø, Røros, and Steinkjer in Norway, as well as Storlien in Sweden.

Hurtigruten's coastal liner has daily, early- to mid-morning stops in Trondheim on both north- and south-bound trips. There are also frequent commuter boats that connect smaller communities including some that connect Trondheim to Vanviken as well as other ports of call including: Brekstad; Kjørsvikbugen; Volden, Hitra; and Kristiansund.

Additionally, during the summer months larger cruise ships stop in Trondheim.

Climate 
The weather is very much decided by the direction of the wind; southerlies and easterlies bring sunny weather, while westerlies bring precipitation with mild weather in winter and cool rainy weather in summer. Northwesterlies bring the worst weather with snow in winter (often sleet or rain on the coast). Average yearly precipitation varies from 2,000 mm in some areas of Fosen, to 850 mm in Trondheim and only 500 mm in Oppdal.
The interior areas at somewhat higher elevations have cold winters with reliable snow cover, while the coastal areas have a maritime climate with mild and more windy winters. Sula in Frøya municipality has an average of 1.5 °C (34 °F) in the coldest month. Røros, at an altitude of 628 m (2,000 ft), has a January average of -11.2 °C (12 °F; Summer temperatures do not differ that much; sheltered lowlands a bit inland will have the warmest summers. Base period 1961-1990.

Gallery

Municipalities

References 

 
States and territories disestablished in 2018
Former counties of Norway
2018 disestablishments in Norway